The 1981–82 Irish Cup was the 102nd edition of Northern Ireland's premier football knock-out cup competition. It began on 30 January 1982, and concluded on 24 April 1982 with the final.

Ballymena United were the defending champions, after winning the cup for the 4th time with a 1–0 win over Glenavon in the 1980–81 final. This season, they went out in the first round after a 3–2 loss to Distillery. Linfield won their 33rd Irish Cup, defeating Coleraine 2–1 in the final.

Results

First round

|}

1This tie required two replays, after the first games ended as 2–2 and 1–1 draws.
2This tie required a replay, after the first game ended as a 0–0 draw.

Quarter-finals

|}

3This tie required two replays, after the first games ended as 2–2 and 0–0 draws.

Semi-finals

|}

Final

References

Irish Cup seasons
2
Northern Ireland